Guyana competed at the 2011 Pan American Games in Guadalajara, Mexico from October 14 to 30, 2011. Guyana sent 19 athletes in five sports.

Medalists

Athletics

Guyana has qualified a team of three athletes.

Men

Track and road events

Rugby sevens

Guyana has qualified a rugby sevens team. It will consist of 12 athletes.

Roster

Vallon Adams
Claudius Butts
Avery Corbin
Rupert Giles
Ryan Gonsalves
Dominic Lespiree
Ronald Mayers
Kevin McKenzie
Richard Staglon
Breon Walks
George Walter
Leon Greaves

Group A

Quarterfinals

Fifth to Eighth place

Seventh place match

Squash

Guyana has qualified one squash athlete.

Women

Swimming

Guyana will send two swimmers who have received wildcards. The team was announced on September 15.

Men

Women

Taekwondo

Guyana has qualified one taekwondo athlete.
Men

References

Nations at the 2011 Pan American Games
P
2011